De Mil Colores (Of a Thousand Colors) is the seventh studio album released by Spanish performer Rosario Flores. It was released by Sony BMG on 18 November 2003. The album was produced by Fernando Illán and earned Flores a Latin Grammy Award for Best Female Pop Vocal Album.

Track listing
This information adapted from Allmusic.

References

2003 albums
Rosario Flores albums
Spanish-language albums
Latin Grammy Award for Best Female Pop Vocal Album